The Caedmon School is an independent, coeducational preschool and elementary school located on the Upper East Side of Manhattan in New York City.  The school, which employs an "inspired" Montessori curriculum, was the first Montessori school established in New York City and the second in the United States.

Founded in 1962, the school currently has approximately 255 students enrolled from Nursery through the Fifth grade.

The school
The school is located in a large former rectory on East 80th Street between First Avenue and York Avenue on the Upper East Side.  The school employs a curriculum based on four foundational concepts: community, diversity, Montessori and academic excellence.  With a faculty of over 40, the student to teacher ratio is approximately 6:1 overall. Class sizes range from 16 to 20 students and with two teachers per class in early grades.

The Caedmon School operates mixed aged classes from children as young as 3 through the second grade. Kindergarten and Third through Fifth Grade are dedicated to a single age group.  Following graduation from Caedmon, the school's fifth grade students attend some of New York's best college preparatory schools. In recent years, Caedmon students have moved on to a variety of schools including: Allen-Stevenson, Brearley, Browning, Chapin, Collegiate, Columbia Prep, Dalton, Horace Mann, Nightingale-Bamford and Spence.

The following are Caedmon's nine age-based educational programs across pre-school and elementary school:

 Young Beginners (age 1.9 to 2.6)
 Beginners (younger than 3)
 Early Program (age 3–4)
 Elementary (Kindergarten through 5th Grade)

Tuition at Caedmon for the 2021-2022 school year range from $18,1600 per year for the Half-Day Preschool classes class to $53,640 per year for the elementary school program.

Other programs
In addition to its core academic activities, Caedmon also provides a number of additional programs including Special Club Activities, Afterschool activities, Childminding, and the well regarded Caedmon School of Music music school, which offers private music lessons to children and adults regardless of enrollment at The Caedmon School. 

Each summer, the school also hosts the Caedmon Discovery Camp. The six-week program provides an educational summer experience built on the same core principles as the school's academic program.

History

At the time that The Caedmon School was founded in 1962, Montessori education was undergoing its second rise in popularity in the United States.  In the late 1950s Nancy McCormick Rambusch, who had undergone Montessori training in London, returned to the US with the idea of reviving Montessori education. Rambusch first founded the Whitby School in Greenwich, Connecticut, which became the flagship school of the American Montessori. In 1960, Rambusch founded the American Montessori Society (AMS).

By the fall of 1961, a group of ten families in New York City who had attended Rambusch's talks began planning a school.  Like Whitby in Connecticut, Caedmon was conceived as a lay Catholic school, but a school that would also be attractive to a diverse community of differing religions.  Certain of the families had conflicting goals on certain issues, including the location for the school and the inclusion of religious instruction.  A number of these families decided to separate to found their own school, which would later become the West Side Montessori School.  The families that remained were to become Caedmon's founding trustees: Marilou and William Doyle; Elizabeth and Vincent Connelly; Joyce and Daniel Flynn; Nellie and Thomas Mahoney; and Robert Hurley.  The Caedmon School would be the first Montessori school established in New York City.  At that time, Caedmon was the second Montessori school in the United States.

In 1969, Josephine Hartog, assumed the position of head of school which she held until 1974.  She was succeeded by Nancy Rambusch who led the school throughout the late 1970s.  Rambusch who had been instrumental in the reintroduction of Montessori schools in the US by adapting the program to better fit American educational culture, had a strong influence on the development of Caedmon.  Also in the 1970s, Caedmon created what was, at the time, the first extended-day activities program among independent schools in Manhattan.

Carol Gose DeVine was who had joined Caedmon in 1970 was named the Head of School in 1979.  She held that position until 2007, making her one of the longest-serving heads of an independent school in the New York area.

In the fall of 1994, Caedmon approached interested families for help in establishing a fund to support diversity at the school.

In 2002, the National Association of Independent Schools' Leading Edge Recognition program recognized Caedmon with its Curriculum Innovation award.  In 2005, the school opened a new gymnasium and science facility.

During the 2012–2013 school year, Caedmon celebrated the 50th anniversary of its founding.

The "Caedmon" name
The school was named after Cædmon, the earliest of all recorded English poets.  The founders of Caedmon decided to select a name that paid tribute to The Whitby School, the first Montessori school in the US, which had served as an inspiration for the Caedmon School.  The poet Cædmon was well known to have been buried in the English town of Whitby, after which the Whitby School had itself been named.

Curriculum

Caedmon's curriculum utilizes an inspired Montessori approach and reflects the highest standards of the most competitive independent schools. A key components of the Montessori method is the classroom environment, which is highly prepared and allows for self-directed, independent learning.  Students learn effective work-study skills in an environment that encourages independence, self-guided learning and responsibility.

At each stage, the curriculum and instruction takes into account the preparation for the next stage in the children's education. In the Elementary Program, students have exposure to the major curricular areas: language arts (i.e., reading, writing, spelling, handwriting), math and social studies.

Caedmon's curriculum is expanded and enriched by regular instruction in art, computer, foreign language (Spanish and Latin), library, music, violin, science, and physical education (including yoga), which are taught by specialists outside the classroom.

References

Being Exclusive Draws Big Crowds; Private Schools Enjoy a Boom, But Demand Exceeds Growth.  New York Times, October 15, 1999
Blackboard: Wonderland II.  New York Times, January 7, 1990
A 'Multinational' School Celebrating Differences Of Multinational Kids.  New York Times, February 16, 1994
Dr. Blackburn Tribute.  School Tube

External links
The Caedmon School

Educational institutions established in 1962
Montessori schools in the United States
Private elementary schools in Manhattan
Private middle schools in Manhattan
1962 establishments in New York City